Out of the Cold is a volunteer driven program run in many Canadian cities during the cold winter months serving homeless and poor community members.  While initially a Catholic program started by Sister Susan Moran at St. Michael's College School,  it has grown into a multi-faith initiative, with community organizations such as churches, synagogues and mosques in a city taking turns providing food, hospitality and medical services.  The program runs from about mid November to early April.

Those receiving the services are called guests.  Guests are treated with care, respect and without judgment.  Unlike other shelter programs, Out of the Cold does not generally require detailed registration.

Typical Services 
Following are list of services that may be offered by an organization participating in the Out of the Cold program.  An organization may choose to provide one or more services depending on their capacity.
 Hot, Cooked Food
 Clothing
 Overnight Bed
 Nurses / Medical Care
 Showers
 Personal Hygiene Services such as Haircut
 Transportation to/from

References

External links 
 OOTC - Toronto
 MIOTC - Regional Municipality of York
 Hamilton Out of the Cold -  Hamilton, Ontario
 Out of the Cold Halifax - Halifax Regional Municipality
 B.O.O.T.C - Barrie, Ontario
 KWOOTC - Kitchener-Waterloo, Ontario

Homelessness in Canada
Poverty in Canada